Mecynotarsus is a genus of monoceros beetles in the family Anthicidae. There are about 19 described species in Mecynotarsus.

Species
These 19 species belong to the genus Mecynotarsus:

 Mecynotarsus abductus
 Mecynotarsus alvarado Chandler
 Mecynotarsus antennalis Hashimoto & Sakai, 2011
 Mecynotarsus bison (Olivier, 1811)
 Mecynotarsus candidus LeConte, 1875
 Mecynotarsus delicatulus Horn, 1868
 Mecynotarsus doberai Telnov, 2016
 Mecynotarsus falcatus Chandler
 Mecynotarsus fasciatus Motschulsky, 1863
 Mecynotarsus faustii Seidlitz, 1891
 Mecynotarsus flavipes Pic, 1913
 Mecynotarsus intermixtus Werner
 Mecynotarsus jamaicanus Werner
 Mecynotarsus nevermanni Werner
 Mecynotarsus quadrimaculatus Pic, 1913
 Mecynotarsus salvadorensis Werner
 Mecynotarsus semicinctus Wollaston, 1865
 Mecynotarsus serricornis (Panzer, 1796)
 Mecynotarsus truquii De Marseul, 1879

References

Further reading

 

Anthicidae
Articles created by Qbugbot